Princess Iman bint Hussein (born 24 April 1983) is a Jordanian princess.

Early life 
On 24 April 1983, Princess Iman was born at King Hussein Medical Center in Amman, Jordan.  Princess Iman is the daughter of King Hussein and Queen Noor of Jordan. She is the sister of King Abdullah II of Jordan, Princess Alia, Prince Faisal, Princess Aisha, Princess Zein, Princess Haya, Prince Ali, Prince Hamzah, Prince Hashem, and Princess Raiyah.

Education 
Princess Iman studied at Garrison Forest School in Baltimore, Maryland, the Fay School in Massachusetts and the Maret School in Washington, D.C. She joined the Royal Military Academy Sandhurst in 2002 and finished her training there on 8 August 2003. She enrolled at American University in Washington, D.C. in 2003 and graduated in 2007 with a degree in Sociology.

Personal life 
On 20 December 2012, the Royal Court of Jordan announced Princess Iman's engagement to businessman Zaid Azmi Mirza. They married on 22 March 2013. She gave birth to a son, Omar, on 7 October 2014. The couple divorced in 2017.

Honours
 
Knight Grand Cordon of the Supreme Order of the Renaissance, Special Class
Knight Grand Cordon of the Order of Military Merit
Recipient of the Al-Hussein Medal of Excellence, 2nd Class

References

External links
The 20 Hottest Young Royals - Princess Iman bint Al Hussein, Forbes

1983 births
Living people
American University alumni
Graduates of the Royal Military Academy Sandhurst
Jordanian princesses
Jordanian people of Scottish descent
Jordanian people of English descent
Jordanian people of Swedish descent
Jordanian people of American descent
Jordanian people of Syrian descent
Fay School alumni
Daughters of kings